Ernst Schröder may refer to:

 Ernst Schröder (actor) (1915-1994), German actor
 Ernst Schröder (mathematician) (1841-1902), German mathematician